Luiz Júnior de Souza Lopes (born 8 October 1981), known as Luizinho Lopes, is a Brazilian football manager and former player who played as a midfielder. He is the current head coach of Brusque.

Honours

Manager
América de Natal
 Campeonato Potiguar: 2019

References

External links
 

1981 births
Living people
Sportspeople from Rio Grande do Norte
Brazilian footballers
Association football midfielders
América Futebol Clube (RN) players
Brazilian football managers
Campeonato Brasileiro Série C managers
Campeonato Brasileiro Série D managers
Associação Desportiva Confiança managers
América Futebol Clube (RN) managers
Treze Futebol Clube managers
Uberlândia Esporte Clube managers
Manaus Futebol Clube managers
Esporte Clube Jacuipense managers
Brusque Futebol Clube managers